Yaar Mera is a 1972 Indian Hindi-language drama film, produced by Rajaram & Satish Wagle on  R.S.Productions banner and directed by Atma Ram. Starring Jeetendra, Rakhee Gulzar  and music composed by Shankar Jaikishan.

Plot
Shyam called him "Yaar Mera" his greatest friend! He had implicit faith in him, all of the city beckoned him. Leaving behind his poor mother and younger sister in the village, Shyam had virtually descended on the big city in search of an honest job but having failed to procure one he adopted a most devil-may-care attitude. he could not be careless about the clutches of the law. So he has broken the law, grabbed, robbed and plundered with impunity, because he was so sure his Supreme Friend was always there to save him from any calamity. And Shyam did get away with all his escapades. Swiftly he rose from rags to riches and on his way managed to get a very pretty girl also Sarla, knew Shyam as Kishan. After all, one has to have aliases when on is playing with the law, of course, Sarla didn't know about his turncoat ways. She genuinely believed that her Kishan was a perfect gentleman and Shyam remained confident that she would never be able to learn the truth about him-his Supreme Friend would see to that and also enjoyed total devotion from Shyam's near and dear ones but with a difference! For instance, Shyam's mother and Sarla, both believed that the Supreme Friend's powers were unquestionable, but they also thought that he could never countenance anything evil. Shyam had different ideas, his many hair-breadth escapes after doing evil had convinced him that his `Yaar would countenance anything which he did!

Cast
Jeetendra as Shyam
Rakhee Gulzar as Sarla
Jayant as Jagat Dada (Shyam's father)
Manmohan as Manmohan
Nana Palsikar as Dinanath 
Paintal as Pascal 
Murad as Nawab of Nawabganj 
Jagdish Raj as Jailor    
Achala Sachdev as Shyam's mother
Nazima as Gullo 
Helen as Rosy
Ruby Mayer 
Mona as Julie

Soundtrack

References

External links
 

1972 films
1970s Hindi-language films
Films scored by Shankar–Jaikishan